Nachit Kuranlu (also Romanized as Nāchīt Kūrānlū; also known as Nāchīt-e Ḩūleh Varān and Nāchīd Gūrānlū) is a village in Charuymaq-e Markazi Rural District, in the Central District of Charuymaq County, East Azerbaijan Province, Iran. At the 2006 census, its population was 153, in 23 families.

Name 
According to Vladimir Minorsky, the name "Nachid" is derived from Mongolian and means "falcons".

References 

Populated places in Charuymaq County